The 2005 2. divisjon season was the third highest association football league for men in Norway.

26 games were played in 4 groups, with 3 points given for wins and 1 for draws. Sarpsborg Sparta, Manglerud Star, Haugesund and Tromsdalen were promoted to the First Division. Number twelve, thirteen and fourteen were relegated to the 3. divisjon. The winning teams from each of the 24 groups in the 3. divisjon each faced a winning team from another group in a playoff match, resulting in 12 playoff winners which were promoted to the 2. divisjon.

League tables

Group 1

Group 2

Group 3

Group 4

Top goalscorers
 30 goals:
  Kenneth Kvalheim, Notodden
 24 goals:
  Vegard Alstad Sunde, Levanger
 23 goals:
  Marc Antoine-Curier, Vard Haugesund
 20 goals:
  Andreas Hauger, Bærum
 19 goals:
  Sami Sakka, Vard Haugesund
  Espen Skogland, Haugesund
 17 goals:
  Robert Stene, Ranheim
 16 goals:
  Andreas Moen, Lørenskog
  Ronald Turner, Sarpsborg Sparta
 15 goals:
  Dag Halvorsen, Kjelsås
  Kim Nysted, Bærum
  Trygve Velten, Drøbak/Frogn
  Fredrik William Henriksen, Flekkerøy
  Rune Ertsås, Steinkjer
  Kennet Thorstveit, Sandnes Ulf

Promotion playoff

References

Goalscorers

Norwegian Second Division seasons
3
Norway
Norway